Sha Lo Tung is an area of Tai Po District, in the northeastern New Territories of Hong Kong.

Administration
For electoral purposes, Sha Lo Tung is part of the Hong Lok Yuen constituency of the Tai Po District Council. It was formerly represented by Zero Yiu Yeuk-sang, who was elected in the local elections until May 2021.

Sha Lo Tung Cheung Uk and Sha Lo Tung Lei Uk are recognized villages under the New Territories Small House Policy.

Geography
Sha Lo Tung is located at approximately 3.8 km north-east from the centre of the Tai Po New Town and is bounded by the Tai Po New Town to the south and surrounded by the Pat Sin Leng Country Park to the north, east and west. More specifically, it is located south of the Hok Tau Reservoir and north of Fung Yuen Village.

Villages
There are two villages in Sha Lo Tung: Cheung Uk and Lei Uk. Lei Uk is divided into Lo Wai and Sun Wai, 'Old Village' and 'New Village'. Cheung Uk is a Grade II Historic Building, while Lo Wai is a Grade III Historic Building.

At the time of the 1911 census, the population of Sha Lo Tung was 307. The number of males was 120.

Fauna
Sha Lo Tung is an important habitat of dragonflies and damselflies.

References

External links

 Delineation of area of existing village Sha Lo Tung Cheung Uk (Tai Po) for election of resident representative (2019 to 2022)
 Delineation of area of existing village Sha Lo Tung Lei Uk (Tai Po) for election of resident representative (2019 to 2022)
 Antiquities Advisory Board. Historic Building Appraisal Sha Lo Tung Cheung Uk Pictures
 Antiquities Advisory Board. Historic Building Appraisal Sha Lo Tung Lei Uk Pictures
 thaiworldview.com - Sha Lo Tung
 Pictures of Sha Lo Tung
 Lisa Hopkinson, Civic Exchange, "Conservation of Sha Lo Tung: A Way Forward", June 2002

Tai Po District